"Baila (Sexy Thing)" (sometimes known as "Baila Morena") is a song by Italian singer Zucchero. The song was first released as the lead single of his ninth studio album Shake, and it was highly popular in Italy and Spain, reaching #1 chart positions, but achieved moderate success in other countries. Zucchero also recorded an English language version for the single release. The song was later re-recorded in Spanish with the Mexican rock band Maná for the compilation album Zu & Co, but only reached chart success in 2006 due to its inclusion in the soundtrack of the film French Fried Vacation 3.

On February 2, 2006, the single entered the French Singles Chart at #64, then jumped straight to #1, which is the third biggest jump to number-one in this country. After four weeks at #1, the singles dropped almost every week on the chart, totaling ten weeks in the top ten, 17 in the top 50 and 28 in the top 100. It was certified Gold by the SNEP.

In 2007, the song was covered by Patrick Fiori and Hélène Ségara and included in a medley available on Les Enfoirés' album La Caravane des Enfoirés.

Composition 
Zucchero co-wrote the song with Roberto Zanetti who used his "Robyx" alias. The song uses vocal samples from Muddy Waters Mannish Boy and Al Greens Take Me To The River.

Track listings

 2001 release

 CD single
 "Baila" (Sexy Thing) (English version) — 4:06
 "Baila" (Sexy Thing) — 4:06

 CD maxi
 "Baila (Sexy Thing)" — 4:07
 "Hey Man - Sing a Song" by Zucchero with B.B. King — 4:49
 "Karma, stai kalma" by Zucchero featuring Irene Fornaciari — 4:45
 "Baila (Sexy Thing)" (Charlie Rapino club mix) — 6:17

 2006 release

 CD single
 "Baila morena" — 4:04
 "Rock Your Mum" by Étienne Perrucchon — 2:46

 Digital download
 "Baila morena" — 4:04

Charts

Peak positions

Year-end charts

Certifications

References 

2001 singles
2006 singles
Maná songs
SNEP Top Singles number-one singles
Number-one singles in Italy
Number-one singles in Spain
Zucchero Fornaciari songs
Spanish-language songs
Songs written by Zucchero Fornaciari
2001 songs
Songs written by Roberto Zanetti